Nyctibatrachus kumbara, common name Kumbara night frog, is a species of frog in the family Nyctibatrachidae endemic to the Western Ghats of India.

References

External links
 Biotaxa
 Amphibians.org

Nyctibatrachus
Frogs of India
Endemic fauna of the Western Ghats
Amphibians described in 2014